The 2012 World Modern Penthathlon Championship was held in Rome, Italy from May 7 to May 13, 2012. The event included pistol shooting, fencing, 200m swimming, show jumping and a 3 km run.

Medal summary

Men's events

Women's events

Mixed events

Medal table

External links
Official website

2012 in Italian sport
2012 in modern pentathlon
International sports competitions hosted by Italy
Sports competitions in Rome
Modern pentathlon in Europe
May 2012 sports events in Italy
2010s in Rome